Vaulen is a neighborhood (delområde) in the city of Stavanger which lies in the southwestern part of the large municipality of Stavanger in Rogaland county, Norway. It is located along the Gandsfjorden in the boroughs of Hillevåg and Hinna.

References

Boroughs and neighbourhoods of Stavanger